Yarrowia is a fungal genus in the family Dipodascaceae. For a while the genus was monotypic, containing the single species Yarrowia lipolytica, a yeast that can use unusual carbon sources, such as hydrocarbons. This has made it of interest for use in industrial microbiology, especially for the production of specialty lipids. Molecular phylogenetics analysis has revealed several other species that have since been added to the genus.

In January 2019, Yarrowia lipolytica yeast biomass was defined by the European Food Safety Authority as a safe novel food – dried and heat‐killed –  with the underlying qualifications that it is widespread in nature, present in the typical environment, may be used as food for people over age 3 (3 grams per day for children under age 10, and 6 grams per day for teens and adults), and may be manufactured as a dietary supplement.

Biology

Habitat 
Yarrowia lipolytica has been isolated from various locations (e.g. milled corn fiber tailings or Paris sewers). Often these environments contain an excess of lipids, which can be efficiently utilized by Y. lipolytica as a carbon and energy source. This species is strictly aerobic.

Oleaginous yeast 

The cells of Y. lipolytica have over 20% fat content, placing it in the group of oleaginous yeasts. Most lipids are stored as triacylglycerids (TAGs). This physiological trait makes this species especially interesting for producing lipid derivates. For example, genetic engineering and process optimization allow it to produce high amounts of eicosapentaenoic acid (EPA).

Dimorphism 

Yarrowia lipolytica has dimorphic growth, which means it can grow in two different phenotypes. The usual form of the cells can be described as round and spherical. When exposed to stressful conditions such as temperature, pH, mechanical or osmotic stress, the cell can switch into a filamentous growth form (also see hyphae).

Genome 
The genome of Y. lipolytica consists of around 20.5 Mbp (mega base pairs), encodes for over 7000 genes and is distributed on six chromosomes (named A to F) and the mitochondrial DNA (M). Naturally, there are small differences in the length of the genomes of different strain isolates. Usually hemiascomycetous yeast have a low number of introns, but Y. lipolytica is an exception with about 15% of genes containing introns.

References 

Ascomycota genera
Saccharomycetes
Taxa described in 1981